LL Pegasi (AFGL 3068) is a Mira variable star surrounded by a pinwheel-shaped nebula, IRAS 23166+1655, thought to be a preplanetary nebula.  It is a binary system that includes an extreme carbon star.  The pair is hidden by the dust cloud ejected from the carbon star and is only visible in infrared light.

Variability

LL Pegasi is obscured at visual wavelengths, but is strongly variable in brightness at infrared wavelengths.  It is classified as a Mira variable and has a period of about 696 days.

Nebula
The nebula displays an unusual Archimedean spiral shape.  The shape is thought to be formed through the interaction between the stellar companion and the carbon star, as has been seen in other binary systems, although not with such a precise geometric form.  The distance between the spiral arms and their rate of expansion is consistent with estimates of the pair's 810 year orbital period based on their apparent angular separation.

Gallery

References

External links
3D view of LL Pegasi
Celestial spiral with a twist
An Extraordinary Celestial Spiral
Celestial spiral goes viral
Hubble Spots Ghostly Space Spiral — discovery.com
An Extraordinary Spiral from LL Pegasi, APOD

Protoplanetary nebulae
IRAS catalogue objects
Pegasi, LL
Pegasus (constellation)
Carbon stars
Mira variables
J23191260+1711331
TIC objects